Rupa Biswas is an Indian singer who is known for her singular Disco Jazz album.

Biography 
She was born as Sukla Biswas in 1955, in Malda Town, West Bengal, India. Biswas was married to Udayan and has a son Debayan.

Her one and only album, Disco Jazz, was released in 1982 when her father took his family on a holiday to Canada.

In 1981, at the University of Calgary's Boris Roubakine Hall, she sang geets and ghazals for three hours to an audience which included people such as a Grammy Award-winning musician, Aashish Khan and his brother, Panesh, who was a tabla-player and a former collaborator of George Harrison.

The Khan brothers helped produce her first album. She was given vocals written by Aashish's wife Firoza and a cordless mic, which she had never seen before. Rupa was used to wearing traditional Indian clothing and all this was a new experience for her. For the album cover image, she chose a dress which she found in the kids' section of a department store and decided to go with a haircut that she still uses today.

After recording her vocals, she spent time in the United Kingdom with her brother Chandan, who later paid for all her recordings. In 1982, Rupa sold a handful of copies of Disco Jazz and soon faded into anonymity. The album disappeared from circulation.

For a long time Rupa remained away from the public eye until her work was rediscovered by Indian filmmaker Ashim Ahluwalia, who owned a rare vinyl copy and selected the tracks "Aaj Shanibar", "Moja Bhari Moja", and "Ayee Morshume Be-Reham Duniya" for the soundtrack of his film, Miss Lovely, which competed in the Un Certain Regard section at the 2012 Cannes Film Festival. It was also released unofficially on a German record label, Ovular.

In April 2016, Fran Korzatowski, a music fan based in Albany, New York, identified the song, Aaj Shanibar, based on the Miss Lovely end credits and later uploaded it to YouTube. A few months later, Dan Snaith discovered Aaj Shanibar on YouTube and immediately selected it for his live DJ sets and radio broadcasts on NTS and Gilles Peterson's Worldwide FM. Since then, the album has been re-issued by The Numero Group, a well-established archival record label.

In 2014, Rupa's son, Debayan Sen, discovered an album inside his house in Kolkata, India. The album featured a picture of his mother, leading to the discovery of her buried musical career. On Google, Sen discovered that the album Disco Jazz was a rarity, selling at high prices on websites such as Discogs and was already viewed by millions on YouTube.

Discography
Albums
Disco Jazz

Songs
 "Aaj Shanibar"
 "Moja Bhari Moja"
 "Ayee Morshume Be‐reham Duniya"
 "East West Shuffle"

References 

Living people
Year of birth missing (living people)
Indian singers
Singers from West Bengal
Women musicians from West Bengal